Angry Birds 2 is a 2015 puzzle video game developed by Rovio Entertainment and is the twelfth game in the Angry Birds series, and is the direct sequel to the original Angry Birds. It is a free-to-play with optional purchases for in-game currency. The gameplay features two new birds named Silver and Melody (the latter added in an update in November 2022), a new ability for Red, spells instead of power-ups and gameplay that occurs in multi-stage levels. It was soft-launched in Canada on March 5, 2015, as Angry Birds Under Pigstruction, released for iOS and Android worldwide on July 30, 2015, and the name was changed to Angry Birds 2.

Reception for Angry Birds 2 was mixed. While praise was given for the game's enhanced graphics and gameplay, criticism was given to the implemented energy system that detracts playability compared to previous games.

Gameplay

Like the original Angry Birds, players use a slingshot to launch birds at nearby structures; a key difference in Angry Birds 2 is the ability to select birds of the desired choice from a deck. This can give the player more freedom by allowing the creation of their own unique strategies. The main enemies of the game are green-colored pigs of varying sizes, who can be defeated using birds, spells, objects or terrain damage. A new feature is that some specialized pigs can defend themselves from birds in various ways, such as knocking them back with projectiles, attracting the birds via a tractor beam, move away from the danger, or even transforming the birds into random objects. These retaliatory tactics, though sometimes effective, can end up backfiring at times.

Individual birds and spells are represented on cards. Tapping on a card will select it, placing its contents on the slingshot for launching. Players get points by destroying objects and pigs; the points will then be multiplied by the selected bird's score multiplier (referred to in-game as Bird Power). The total score multiplier is made up of 4 factors: bird level, highest hat level, slingshot level & hatchling level. Birds can be leveled up by gaining their respective feathers (with each level requiring more feathers than the previous one). Hats, which are bought using black pearls (found in a multitude of ways), will give a score boost to a bird based on the best hat which the player has for that bird. The slingshot can be leveled up by completing hat sets, providing a score boost to all the players' birds. Finally, players can feed a Hatchling by tapping an egg near their slingshot and hatch it. The hatchling provides a certain multiplier bonus, depending on the hatchling level, to all of the birds, but must be fed with apples (found in many game parts) at least once every 24 to 48 hours to stop it from leaving. Once fed enough times, the player can also level it up, increasing the multiplier bonus and the apples requirements. 

Levels include multiple waves of pigs, which progress through separate structures, each one completely independent of one another. Only three cards can be displayed at a time; the rest appear in the deck. The "Destruct-o-meter" fills up during play as the player destroys buildings, and if it is completely filled, a random card will be given to the player, either a bird or a spell. In boss levels, the player must defeat King Pig, Foreman Pig and Chef Pig. Spells are also disabled in boss levels. The player can also use the fast-forward button to speed up to the next wave. The player begins with five lives and loses one if all cards have been used with at least one pig remains undefeated and the player neither pays gems to get 3 birds nor watches a video to get 1; once all five lives have been lost, the player must pay gems, watch an advertisement to get 1 life or wait 30 minutes in order to get 1 life. However, lives are not used nor required in the Arena, the Bootcamp or in clan events, which can be played even if the player is out of lives.

Levels will sometimes contain items, either an apple, a friend gift (which can be given to friends when connected to Facebook, now removed due to a change in Facebook’s policies) or a rare chest. They can be acquired if an object passes through the item, in which the player can only collect it if they successfully complete the level. Occasionally, a golden pig may appear in place of another pig in some rooms and will completely fill the "Destruct-o-meter" when they are destroyed. They are required to go to the next stage though but are helpful to get one extra card irrespective of destruction caused. However, if one has a nearly full Destruct-o-meter, popping a golden pig straightaway will just fill the bar to full. The game may be connected to Facebook to backup scores & progress and give friend gifts to friends (this feature has since been removed) or Sign in with Apple on iOS devices. Gems, lives, avatars, and many miscellaneous items can be earned from in-app purchases; gems can also be collected by completing daily quests.

Game modes 
There are several game modes in Angry Birds 2 other than the regular campaign levels, including the Daily Challenge and King Pig Panic, Tower of Fortune, the Arena, Mighty Eagle's Bootcamp & Clans and other limited-time events.

Daily Challenge 
The Daily Challenge is a set of 3 levels (1 normal, 1 hard & 1 boss) which must be completed all in a row to get the prize. If the player fails any of the 3 levels, the player loses a life and must start over from the first level. Once completed, the player can try to beat the King Pig Panic, which features bigger prizes but requires completion of 3 boss levels in a row.

Tower of Fortune 
The Tower of Fortune is an elevator with 60 floors (in 2017 it has 90 floors rare), and functions similarly to the international game show Who Wants to Be a Millionaire?. On each floor, players can pick one of 4 cards. 3 of them will contain loot (either feathers, spells, gems, or apples), which will be added to the player's winnings. The other card contains a pig, who will steal all the items the player has previously gathered unless the pig is paid with gems, or (assuming that’s the first time a pig was encountered) the player can watch a video to continue. The player can quit at any time, and the player can collect their winnings and exit the tower. Every 5th floor is a Jackpot floor and every 30th floor is a Super-Jackpot floor, where all 4 cards contain hats and no pigs (the rarity of which are predetermined, in floor 60 (in 2017 it has 90 floors rare)), one in 4 cards contains a Jackpot Egg. The items get progressively better the higher up the player ascends, but so does the risk of encountering a pig.

Arena 
The Arena is unlocked after reaching level 5. The concept of the Arena is similar to Angry Birds Friends. Players around the world were randomly divided into a batch of 15 and feathers were awarded to a particular bird according to the high score of each player in an endless level of the same arena event which changed every day. After the Mount Everest update, with the same division of players, the Arena became a seven-day-long tournament where the rewards were gems and black pearls instead of feathers. The endless levels of arena events are now randomly given and not fixed for a particular day and multiple events can be played in a day. Instead of a player playing alone for a high score, now the player competes with a randomly chosen opponent, and one with a better score is awarded stars according to the margin of victory. Stars determines the position of the players. The top three in the same league are promoted to a higher league and the bottom three are demoted to a lower league. Players also get medals if they finish in the top three in Arena. 

Update 2.48 (released in December 2020) gave a massive overhaul to the arena and its functionality. Each day, there will be a random set of 5 birds which will be the only ones usable in the Arena. Additionally, the win streaks are shorter and their prizes can only be claimed once per day. Each player will have an arena "ranking" which can go up and down depending if the player wins or loses. Although stars are still awarded, the weekly leaderboard is based on the player's total ranking gain. Once the player's ranking reaches certain thresholds, they will advance to a higher league, featuring tougher opponents, improved win streak prizes and a bigger end-of-season reward.

This is the only traditional slingshot Angry Birds game with procedurally generated levels, which might be the reason why as of July 2020, the game has 2700 levels in its campaign mode.

Mighty Eagle's Bootcamp 
Mighty Eagle's Bootcamp is a daily training in the game. It gets open on Level 37. A player can play the Mighty Eagle's Bootcamp daily and earn points which help them to increase their clan ratings. They can also Increase their Avtar Frames by playing the daily training, after the end of every season players earn the Mighty coins from the Frames they reach (The Highest is Legendary and The lowest is Vanila) which help them to buy Legendary Hats, Feathers of Birds, Pearls, and Legendary Chests in the Mighty Eagle's Shop.

Clan 
The place where a player can join in a Group (Clan) and play with other players to win various events and clan battles. It gets open on Level 47. Each clan has maximum strength of 50 players. A Clan can get ratings on the basis of their players Earn points in the Might Eagle's Bootcamp. The highest rating is Diamond and The lowest rating is Bronze. A player can make his own clan by 350 Gems or Rubies.

Plot
After the events of Angry Birds, Chef Pig takes the eggs and puts them in an airship, leaving Red to gather the rest of the flock pursuing him and the rest of the pigs. After Chef Pig is defeated, Foreman Pig takes over the ship in order to prevent the birds from recovering the eggs. Once Foreman Pig is defeated, King Pig commands the airship. This cycle repeats for the entirety of the campaign levels.

In other media
Silver, a bird who first appeared in the game, went on to appear in the animated film The Angry Birds Movie 2, voiced by Rachel Bloom. In that film, she is Chuck's sister, a skilled engineer and a potential love interest for Red.

Promotions
Rovio uses new spells for promotional use which are similar to the 'Golden Duck' spell. These spells can be used until the completion of only one level and no other spell can be used on that particular level. These spells are available for a limited time and change with ongoing events.

The ongoing festivities are also promoted by specially designed levels which gives a premium treasure box in return if the players win it. Only one attempt is given for this level. This started on February 14, 2016 which promoted Valentine's Day through a specially designed level. These levels were only available for a limited time.

The Gravity Grove update promoted The Angry Birds Movie by using the character appearances from the movie in the levels.

Reception

The game has received mixed reviews. Pocket Gamer gave the game a 7/10, feeling that the gameplay was a step forward in puzzle design and the graphics were gorgeous; however, it did not like the energy system that, after failing to complete a few levels, either makes the player stop playing or use gems to continue playing; overall the website thought the game was Rovio at its best. IGN awarded it a score of 6.7 out of 10, saying "Ever-shifting levels and limited lives take a lot of the fun out of smashing pigs with birds in Angry Birds 2."

Three days after its release, Angry Birds 2 was downloaded over 10 million times; it is a free game on all platforms. One week after its release, Angry Birds 2 was downloaded over 20 million times. On August 6, 2015, the game was the number one downloaded iOS game in 100 countries and the most downloaded game on Android.

References

External links

 

2015 video games
Android (operating system) games
2
IOS games
Puzzle video games
Video game sequels
Video games developed in Finland
Rovio Entertainment games